Neuendorf A is a village and a former municipality in the Vorpommern-Greifswald district, in Mecklenburg-Vorpommern, Germany. The municipality consisted of Neuendorf itself and the village of Kurtshagen. Since 1 January 2012, it is part of the municipality Ducherow.

References

Former municipalities in Mecklenburg-Western Pomerania